Motygino is the name of several inhabited localities in Russia.

Urban localities
Motygino, Krasnoyarsk Krai, a work settlement in Motyginsky District of Krasnoyarsk Krai

Rural localities
Motygino, Pskov Oblast, a village in Sebezhsky District of Pskov Oblast
Motygino, Yaroslavl Oblast, a village in Yermakovsky Rural Okrug of Lyubimsky District of Yaroslavl Oblast